HMS Orontes was a 19th-century troopship of the Royal Navy, intended for carrying troops to southern Africa and the West Indies (rather than to India like the  of troopships such as Serapis).

Design
Her displacement was 4,857 tons (or 5,600 tons after her 1876 lengthening). She was 300 feet long (though this was increased in 1876) and her beam was 44½ foot. She had only a nominal armament, of three 4 pounder guns.

History
Her design was produced by the Controller of the Navy. She was launched from Cammell Laird shipbuilders at Birkenhead on 22 November 1862. In March 1863 she was completed and commissioned. On 14 December 1866, she was driven ashore at Cork. On 11 November 1871 she left Quebec, bringing the city's last imperial garrison back to Britain. While bound for Bermuda from Halifax, Nova Scotia, in 1878, a man fell overboard and the rescue party of fourteen men were lost when the rescue boat they were in capsized. In 1879 she brought the body of Louis Napoléon, Prince Imperial, killed earlier that year in the Zulu War, back to Britain. In 1893 she was sold and then broken up for scrap on the River Thames.

Orontes in fiction
She is notable in fiction as the troopship which brought Dr. John Watson back to Britain during his convalescence after the 1880 Battle of Maiwand, in the third paragraph of Chapter 1 of Arthur Conan Doyle's 1887 Sherlock Holmes work A Study in Scarlet.

References

External links
 
 Images of HMS Orontes (1862) at the National Maritime Museum
 William Rook
 Thomas Bush Hardy, HMS Orontes leaving Portsmouth with troops for the East, 1886

 

Troop ships of the Royal Navy
Victorian-era naval ships of the United Kingdom
1862 ships
Ships built on the River Mersey
Maritime incidents in December 1866